Edward (Ed) Niedermeyer is an American author, analyst, and critic who focuses on the automotive industry and mobility innovation. His writing has been published in The New York Times, The Truth About Cars, and The Wall Street Journal, and in 2019, his book Ludicrous: The Unvarnished Story of Tesla Motors was released. Niedermeyer cohosts The Autonocast, a podcast about autonomous vehicles technology and its effects.

Career 
Niedermeyer began covering the automotive industry in 2008 as a contributor to The Truth About Cars and later became its Editor-in-Chief, where he often covered General Motors and Chrysler. After leaving Cars, he joined The Drive as a Senior Editor and continued to write bylines as freelancer. In 2018, he joined Automotive News. In 2019, Niedermeyer published his book about Tesla, Inc.  with BenBella Books, offering a skeptical perspective on the electric car company's history.

In response to a story broken by Niedermeyer about the company, Tesla published a 2016 blog post stating it was a fabrication and suggesting that he was shorting Tesla's stock, leading to online harassment. Nathan Robinson has suggested that there is "probably no greater expert on the career of Elon Musk and the development of Tesla [than Niedermeyer]." His insights regarding Tesla Autopilot in particular have been cited repeatedly.

External links 

 The Autonocast website

References 

Living people
American male non-fiction writers
Year of birth missing (living people)
American journalists
Tesla, Inc.
General Motors
University of Oregon alumni